Vangelis Georgiou (born 4 November 1988) is a Greek footballer.

Career
Born in Thessaloniki, Georgiou began playing football with local side PAOK. After a one-year loan period to Panserraikos F.C., he returned to PAOK, but finally he was not in the plans of the new manager of the team. On 5 August 2011, he agreed to terminate his contract.

He usually plays as a left defender but he is also capable of playing as a left midfielder.

References

External links
Profile at Onsports.gr

1988 births
Living people
Greek footballers
PAOK FC players
Kavala F.C. players
Panserraikos F.C. players
Super League Greece players
Ergotelis F.C. players
Association football fullbacks
Association football wingers
Footballers from Thessaloniki